Komorów  is a village in the administrative district of Gmina Michałowice, within Pruszków County, Masovian Voivodeship, in east-central Poland.

The village has a population of 4,570.

It was founded in 1424. The name comes from the Slavic name Komor. It has its own suburban light railway station (Komorów) (Warszawska Kolej Dojazdowa).

In 1956, novelist Maria Dąbrowska settled in Komorów. Her residence currently houses a local library.

Notable residents
Maria Dąbrowska (1889–1965), novelist, essayist and journalist
Magda Gessler (born 1953), television personality, celebrity chef, restaurateur and painter

References

Villages in Pruszków County